Jean Depassio (date of birth unknown, died April 1925) was a French sports shooter. He competed in two events at the 1908 Summer Olympics.

References

Year of birth missing
1925 deaths
French male sport shooters
Olympic shooters of France
Shooters at the 1908 Summer Olympics
Place of birth missing